Faith Based Initiative may refer to:

 Faith Based Initiative (The West Wing), an episode of the television series, The West Wing (season 6)
 Faith-based organization
 White House Office of Faith-Based and Neighborhood Partnerships, formerly the White House Office of Faith-Based and Community Initiatives

See also 
 Faith-based (disambiguation)